Sheril Kirshenbaum (born May 24, 1980) is an American science writer and scientist. She co-authored Unscientific America: How Scientific Illiteracy Threatens Our Future with Chris Mooney, and wrote The Science of Kissing. She also co-founded and led Science Debate, a nonprofit organization with a stated goal of restoring science to its rightful place in politics.

Sheril currently works at Michigan State University and hosts Serving Up Science on PBS. Her research focuses on scientific decision-making in Congress. She is of Jewish descent.

References

1980 births
20th-century American Jews
Living people
American science writers
21st-century American Jews